Ben Dowling (born 5 March 2000) is an Australian rugby union player who plays for the  in Super Rugby. His playing position is wing or fullback. He was named in the Waratahs squad for the 2023 Super Rugby Pacific season. He has also represented the Australia national rugby sevens team, being named in the squad for the 2022 Commonwealth Games.

Dowling was born and raised in Sydney, and attended St Joseph's College, having been a member of the Waratahs academy since U18 level, while playing club rugby for Randwick. He has represented Australia at Rugby Sevens since 2021, and was named in the Australia U20 side in 2022.

Reference list

External links
itsrugby.co.uk profile

Australian rugby union players
Living people
2000 births
Rugby union wings
Rugby union fullbacks
New South Wales Waratahs players
Australia international rugby sevens players
Rugby union players from Sydney